Scorpius is a defense weapon system designed to disrupt the communications and radar of UAVs, ships, missiles and more.  It is being produced by Israel Aerospace Industries (IAI) and was announced on November 12, 2021.

Description

According to IAI more and more weaponry is centered around the electromagnetic realm, and this system is specifically designed to counteract those threats.

Scorpius works by directing narrowly targeted beams against specific targets.  This system is designed to not interfere with anyone other than the target. The system is capable of targeting multiple threats simultaneously and has unprecedented range.

One of IAI's VP's of marketing said that the name was intended to convey  "the sense of an innocuous thing that actually has a very powerful sting."

References

Weapons countermeasures